CRG may refer to:
 Classification Research Group (Library and information science)
 CRG Gallery, a contemporary art gallery in Chelsea, New York
 CRG (kart manufacturer), an Italian chassis manufacturer
 CRG West, a privately held, wholly owned subsidiary of The Carlyle Group established in 2001
 Waco CRG or Waco G series, an early 1930s American open-cockpit sporting biplane
 Cargoitalia ICAO airline designator
 Carolina Rollergirls, an all-women, flat-track roller derby
 The Gazette (Cedar Rapids), a Cedar Rapids newspaper
 Centre for Genomic Regulation, a genomics research centre based on Barcelona
 Colonial Radio Group, the owner of several radio stations in the United States
 Communications Research Group, a data communications software company
 Control Risks Group, a private risk consultancy firm
 Corporate Responsibility Group, a UK professional association
 Cory Rooney Group, a music label
 Council for Responsible Genetics, a public interest group with a focus on biotechnology
 Craig Municipal Airport IATA airport code
 Cultural Revolution Group, a 1966 Chinese organisation
 Centre for Research on Globalization, a Canadian conspiracy theory publisher founded by Michel Chossudovsky
 a trim level of the 1984 Japanese Toyota Van
 COVID Recovery Group, a group of British Conservative MPs

crg may refer to :
 Michif language ISO 639-3 code